Jana Sterbak (Jana Štěrbáková) is a multidisciplinary artist of Czech origin.

Life and career
Sterbak earned a Bachelor of Fine Arts at Concordia University, completing classes in film history with John Locke and Tom Waugh, as well as painting with Yves Gaucher   Guido Molinari. In the 1980s, she studied in art history at the University of Toronto and at New York University, ultimately abandoning her studies to dedicate herself to her artistic practice.  In her artistic approach, performance is incorporated into her photography, film, and video installations.

In the 1990s, Sterbak moved  to Paris to teach at the École nationale supérieure des beaux-arts (ENSBA). At age 36, a retrospective of her work was held at the National Gallery of Canada (1991) and subsequently shown at MIT in Boston  and at the Museum of Contemporary Art San Diego (1992).

Her European career began in 1990 at Aperto,  the international section of the Venice Biennale, where co-curator Bernard Blistène chose to present her work. Several solo shows followed: in 1992, at the Louisiana Museum of Modern Art (Denmark) and at the MoMA New York, where one of her iconic installations, Sisyphus, was presented (this work then joined MAC Marseille's collection,) and in 1993 at La Caixa Foundation in Barcelona. Velleitas, a solo exhibition curated by Corinne Diserens was presented in 1995 at the Musee d’art moderne of Saint-Étienne and at Fundació Antoni Tàpies in Barcelona, and at the Serpentine Gallery in London in 1996. 

In the early 2000s, she produced two video installations. The first, From Here to there, represented Canada at the 2003 Venice Biennale; the second, Waiting for High Water, shot in Venice during the acqua alta phenomenon, was presented at the Prague Biennale in 2005. Waiting for High Water became her most exhibited video installation (catalogue text from Hubert Damisch.) 

In 2012, Sterbak, a Canadian citizen since her twentieth birthday, received a Governor General’s Award in the Visual and Media Arts, and in 2017, she won the Prix Paul-Émile-Borduas (Quebec).

"Her biography may not be directly reflected in her works, but it has provided a pool of experience for an examination of the question as to how different societies are connected with one another. These are questions pertaining to human conflicts in contemporary life, to the tension between the private and public spheres, between freedom and dependence.
Jana Sterbak’s works are as poetic as they are political. They are conceptually precise, interweaving the immediacy of specific materials with references to motifs from mythology, literature and philosophy. Her materials are often ephemeral and transformative, such as the ice that forms the slowly melting chairs of Dissolution-Auditorium, or the pieces of flesh sewn together to make a dress in her famous and much-discussed work and widely copied Vanitas: Flesh Dress for an Albino Anorexic." Both are powerful metaphors for social as well as physical processes that speak to us explicitly on a personal and sensory level.

Awards 
 1991: Guggenheim Fellowship, John Simon Guggenheim Memorial Foundation, United States
 1993: Prix Antoine Guichard, Fondation Casino, Musée de Saint-Étienne, France (now discontinued)
 1993: Victor Martyn Lynch-Staunton Award from the Canada Council
 1996: Prix Ozias Leduc, Fondation Émile-Nelligan, Montreal
 2012: Governor General's Awards in Visual and Media Arts, Canada
 2017: Prix Paul-Émile-Borduas, Québec

References

External links
Concordia University Art History
www.janasterbak.com
Jana Sterbak on Artnet
Corinne Diserens: Jana Sterbak. Velleitas Exhibition at Fundació Antoni Tàpies
Jana Sterbak fonds at the National Gallery of Canada, Ottawa, Ontario

1955 births
Living people
Canadian women sculptors
20th-century Canadian sculptors
21st-century sculptors
Canadian people of Czech descent
Artists from Prague
Concordia University alumni
Czechoslovak emigrants to Canada
Canadian contemporary artists
20th-century Canadian women artists
21st-century Canadian women artists
Governor General's Award in Visual and Media Arts winners